Treat Huey and Denis Kudla were the defending champions but only Kudla chose to defend his title, partnering Hans Hach Verdugo. Kudla lost in the quarterfinals to Hugo Nys and Jan Zieliński.

Nathaniel Lammons and Jackson Withrow won the title after defeating Nys and Zieliński 6–7(1–7), 6–4, [10–8] in the final.

Seeds

Draw

References

External links
 Main draw

Arizona Tennis Classic - Doubles